A cape cart is a two-wheeled four-seater carriage drawn by two horses and formerly used in South Africa. Equipped with a bowed canvas or leather hood, it was used to carry passengers and mail in the days before railways and was one of the fastest means of transport available in the region. Cape carts were developed during the Boer War as a safe way to travel across even rough terrain. The name comes from the Cape of Good Hope.

Known in Afrikaans from before the 1820s as a kapkar  (a cart with a hood) its name was mistakenly rendered by English-speaking people as Cape cart.

See also 
 Types of carriages

References

Carriages